Brown rice green tea is green tea blended with roasted brown rice. In Korea, it is called hyeonmi-nokcha (literally "brown rice green tea") and is considered a blend of nokcha (green tea) and hyeonmi-cha (brown rice tea). In Japan, green tea blended with puffed brown rice is called genmaicha (literally, "brown rice tea").

Preparation 
In Korea, hyeonmi-nokcha is made by blending jeungje-cha (green tea that were steamed, not roasted, before being dried) leaves and roasted brown rice. Popular in both the loose and tea bag forms, brown rice green tea varieties are produced by Hankook Tea and Sulloc Tea.

Nutrition 
 of brown rice green tea contains ,  carbohydrate,  protein,  fat, and  sodium. Few of these nutrients will be present in the brewed liquid.

See also 
 Brown rice tea
 Genmaicha – Japanese green tea blended with puffed brown rice

References 

Blended tea
Green tea
Korean tea
Rice drinks